Ryan Taylor may refer to:

Sportspeople
Ryan Taylor (American football) (born 1987), American football tight end
Ryan Taylor (basketball) (born 1992), American basketball player
Ryan Taylor (footballer, born 1984), English footballer who plays as a full back
Ryan Taylor (footballer, born 1988), English footballer who plays as a striker
Ryan Taylor (hurler), Irish hurler who plays for Clare and Clooney–Quin
Ryan Taylor (soccer) (born 1990), American soccer player who plays for Richmond Kickers
Ryan Taylor (sport shooter) (born 1980), New Zealand rifle shooter
Ryan Taylor (wrestler) (born 1987), American professional wrestler also known as Tyler Rust in WWE and currently wrestles for Empire Wrestling Federation

Other
Ryan Taylor (politician) (born 1970), former North Dakota Senate Minority Leader